The 2021 Lebanese Challenge Cup was the 8th edition of the Lebanese Challenge Cup. The competition included the teams placed between 7th and 10th in the 2020–21 Lebanese Premier League, and the two newly promoted teams from the 2020–21 Lebanese Second Division. The first matchday was played on 13 July, one day after to the start of the 2021 Lebanese Elite Cup. Bourj, the defending champions, won their second title after beating Tripoli in the final.

Group stage

Group A

Group B

Final stage

Semi-finals

Final

Top scorers

References

External links
 RSSSF

Lebanese Challenge Cup seasons
Challenge